The Women's K-1 200 metres event at the 2015 Southeast Asian Games took place on 9 June 2015 at Marina Channel.

Six competitors representing six countries took part in this event.

Schedule
All times are Singapore Standard Time (UTC+08:00)

Start list

Results

Final

References

External links
SEA Games 2015 - Canoeing Sport Schedule

Canoeing at the 2015 Southeast Asian Games
Women's sports competitions in Singapore
2015 in women's canoeing